The PL-10 (NATO reporting name: CH-AA-9), formerly known as PL-ASR (stands for PiLi-Advanced Short Range), is a short-range, infrared-homing air-to-air missile (AAM) developed by the People's Republic of China. It was designed by Dr. Liang Xiaogeng (梁晓庚) at the Luoyang Electro Optical Center, which is also known as the Institute 612 and was renamed in 2002 as the China Air-to-Air Guided Missile Research Institute (中国空空导弹研究院). Development of the missile commenced in 2004 for use on stealth fighters such as the J-20.

History
The development of PL-10 initiated in 2004, and the design was reportedly approved in 2010. The missile entered production in 2013. The chief designer of PL-10 is Liang Xiaogeng of the Shanghai Academy of Science and Technology. Pictures of the PL-10, then known as the PL-ASR, appeared on the Chinese internet in 2008. It was observed mounting on a PLAAF Chengdu J-20 in 2015.

Design
The PL-10 is fitted with an advanced multi-element imagining infrared (IIR) sensor that identifies the target based on shape, giving it all-aspect targeting capability, longer target detection range, and enhanced resistance to chaff and flare. It's reportedly very resistant to jamming and electronic countermeasures. The missile is capable of lock-on after launch (LOAL), giving it ability to update target data using datalink while in flight.

The multi-element IIR seeker is capable of +/-90 degree off boresight angles and can be slaved to a helmet-mounted display (HMD). This allows the pilot to track a target beyond the aircraft's radar scan envelope using the missile's high off-boresight capability, achieved by the pilot turning his head towards the target to lock-on, better known as "look and shoot".

Flight is controlled by a thrust-vector controlled solid rocket motor and free-moving control wings on the missile's tail, which facilitate the missile to achieve turn capability of over 60Gs and high angles of
attack. The central portion of the missile has long, thin strakes, which help maintain missile maneuverability in the terminal homing stage after the rocket motor stops firing. 

According to the assessment by Royal United Services Institute, the PL-10 provides comparable performance to European ASRAAM and IRIS-T missiles, while offering superior kinematic performances against AIM-9X. According to aviation researcher Justin Bronk, the overall capability of the PL-10 reaches an approximate parity with Western systems and surpasses Russian technologies.

See also
 PL-8
 PL-9
 AIM-9X
 ASRAAM
 IRIS-T

References

Bibliography

</ref>

Air-to-air missiles of the People's Republic of China
Military equipment introduced in the 2010s